The sport of association football in the Turks and Caicos Islands is run by the Turks and Caicos Islands Football Association. The association administers the national football team, as well as the WIV Provo Premier League.

League system

National football stadium